Cryptothecia lichexanthonica is a species of corticolous (bark-dwelling) lichen in the family Arthoniaceae. Found in Brazil, it was formally described as a new species in 2013 by Edvaneide Leandro de Lima, André Aptroot, and Marcela Eugenia da Silva Cáceres. The thallus, which is 0.1–0.2 mm thick, is surrounded by a thin (about 0.3–0.6 mm) brown hypothallus. The ascospores are muriform (sectioned into more or less equal chambers), ellipsoid in shape, and measure 55–75 by 22–28 μm. The specific epithet lichexanthonica refers to lichexanthone, a secondary chemical that occurs in the thallus. This compound is rare in the genus Cryptothecia, as the only other congener in which it known is to occur is Cryptothecia assimilis.

References

lichexanthonica
Lichen species
Lichens described in 2013
Lichens of Northeast Brazil
Taxa named by André Aptroot
Taxa named by Marcela Cáceres